The Breiðablik men's football team is the men's football department of the Breiðablik multi-sport club. It currently plays in the Besta deild karla, the top-tier men's football league in Iceland; they finished 1st in 2022. The team is based in Kópavogur, a short distance south of Reykjavik.

History
Breiðablik's first competitive match was played on 12 June 1957, a 1–0 loss against Þróttur Reykjavík. After several years in the lower leagues, Breiðablik competed in the country's top division, the Úrvalsdeild karla (Úrvalsdeild), for the first time in 1971. From 1971 to 2005, Breiðablik would bounce between the two top leagues in Iceland (Úrvalsdeild and second-tier 1. deild karla), being promoted and relegated on a regular basis.

Since being promoted into the 2006 Úrvalsdeild, Breiðablik men's team has established itself as a powerhouse in Iceland, challenging regularly on all fronts. As of completion of the COVID-19 shortened 2020 Úrvalsdeild, Breiðablik has earned a place in their 17th consecutive season in the Úrvalsdeild.

The team's first major trophy came with a win in the 2009 Icelandic Cup, followed by the team's first Úrvalsdeild champions title in 2010. Their 2009 Icelandic Cup win qualified them for their first ever European competition, entering the second qualifying round of the 2010–11 UEFA Europa League, facing Scottish Premier League side Motherwell. They lost the first leg 1–0 in Scotland, and lost by the same score in the return leg, for a loss of 0–2 on aggregate. Their 2010 Úrvalsdeild title took Breiðablik to their second consecutive European competition, entering the second qualifying round of the 2011–12 UEFA Champions League, facing Norwegian Tippeligaen champion Rosenborg, losing 2–5 on aggregate. Breiðablik won its first match in a European competition in the first qualifying round of the 2013–14 UEFA Europa League, with a 4–0 win in the first leg against Andorran Copa Constitució winner FC Santa Coloma, en route to their first aggregate win (4–0) of a round in a European competition.

With one of the largest youth facilities in Iceland, Breiðablik is almost entirely built on home-grown talent. In the early 2000s, Iceland national football team internationals who came through the Breiðablik youth ranks included: Jóhann Berg Guðmundsson (first senior national team cap in 2008); Guðmundur Kristjánsson (2009); Alfreð Finnbogason and Gylfi Sigurðsson (both in 2010).

Players

Current squad

 (on loan from NSÍ Runavík)

Player records
As of match played 9 February 2023 and according to official supporters site. Players in bold are still currently playing for Breiðablik.

All-time appearances for Breiðablik

*Arnar Grétarsson played over two periods: 1988–96 and 2006–10
**Arnór Sveinn Aðalsteinsson played over three periods: 2003–11, 2014–2016 and 2023 -
***Finnur Orri Margeirsson played over two periods: 2008–14 and 2021

Most goals scored for Breiðablik

*Jón Þórir Jónsson played over two periods: 1985–94 and 1998–99
**Sigurður Grétarsson played over two periods: 1979–83 and 1998–00
***Arnar Grétarsson played over two periods: 1988–96 and 2006–10

Notable players
Players from the Breiðablik youth academy who have earned international caps at senior level. Correct as of 1 December 2022.

Honours

League
Besta deild karla (First Division)
 Champions (2): 2010, 2022
 Runners-up (4): 2012, 2015, 2018, 2021

1. deild karla (Second Division)
 Champions (6): 1970, 1975, 1979, 1993, 1998, 2005

Cups
Icelandic Cup
 Champions (1): 2009
 Runners-up (2): 1971, 2018

Icelandic League Cup
 Champions (2): 2013, 2015
 Runners-up (4): 1996, 2009, 2010, 2014

Icelandic Super Cup
 Runners-up (2): 2010, 2011, 2022

Club records

 Record League victory: 13–0 v HK, 1. deild karla 1999
 Record League defeat: 1–10 v ÍA, Úrvalsdeild 1973

European record

Club ranking
Correct as of 23 March 2021. The table shows the position of Breiðablik (highlighted), based on their UEFA coefficient club ranking, and the four foreign teams which are closest to Breiðablik's position (two clubs with the higher coefficient and two with the lower coefficient).

Domestic results
Below is a table with Breiðablik's domestic results since the club's first season in the football league in 1957.

References

External links
   

 
Football clubs in Iceland
Sport in Kópavogur
Association football clubs established in 1950
1950 establishments in Iceland